Daneman is a surname. Notable people with the surname include:

Paul Daneman (1925–2001), English actor
Sophie Daneman, British soprano, daughter of Paul

English-language surnames